Mikhail Yesin (born 25 January 1968) is a Soviet ski jumper. He competed at the 1988 Winter Olympics, the 1992 Winter Olympics and the 1994 Winter Olympics.

References

1968 births
Living people
Soviet male ski jumpers
Olympic ski jumpers of the Soviet Union
Olympic ski jumpers of the Unified Team
Olympic ski jumpers of Russia
Ski jumpers at the 1988 Winter Olympics
Ski jumpers at the 1992 Winter Olympics
Ski jumpers at the 1994 Winter Olympics
Place of birth missing (living people)